"Dig In" is a song by American singer-songwriter Lenny Kravitz, the lead single from his sixth studio album, Lenny (2001). It was released in September 2001. It was used in promos by the National Basketball Association for the 2002 NBA Playoffs, as well as the ending theme for the film Returner.

Reception
Carla Hay of AXS stated, "'Dig In' was the first single from the 2001 album Lenny. It’s got all the elements of a classic Kravitz rock song, including an addictive chorus and great rhythm. It’s hard to forget this song once you’ve heard it."

Chart performance
"Dig In" is one of the most successful songs by Kravitz in the United States. In addition to its number 31 peak on the Billboard Hot 100 in December 2001, it peaked at number 13 on Billboard's Hot Modern Rock Tracks chart. In Europe, the single entered several charts, including those of Italy, Portugal, and Spain, reaching the top 10 in these regions.

Music video
The music video was directed by Samuel Bayer, who also directed "Black Velveteen" for Kravitz. The video starts with a QVC-like program with a woman selling products such as expensive jewelry. Suddenly, there is a signal interference that leads to show Kravitz and his band performance at a floating base in the sea, while they are being surrounded by a helicopter. Much of the music video has special effects designed to make the video seem to have tracking issues.

Awards
Kravitz was awarded the Grammy Award for Best Male Rock Vocal Performance in 2002 for his performance on this song. It was his fourth consecutive win of this award.

Track listings
UK and Australian CD single
 "Dig In" – 3:37
 "Rosemary" – 5:34
 "Can't Get You Off My Mind" (acoustic) – 4:37

European CD single
 "Dig In" – 3:37
 "Can't Get You Off My Mind" (acoustic) – 4:37

Charts

Weekly charts

Year-end charts

Release history

References

Lenny Kravitz songs
2001 singles
2001 songs
Grammy Award for Best Male Rock Vocal Performance
Music videos directed by Samuel Bayer
Song recordings produced by Lenny Kravitz
Songs written by Lenny Kravitz
Virgin Records singles